This article details the Catalans Dragons rugby league football club's 2006 season. This is their 1st season in the Super League. Catalans won their first Super League match 38-30 at home against Wigan Warriors in front of 11,000 people.

Table

Milestones

Round 1: Laurent Frayssinous, Justin Murphy, Teddy Sadaoui, John Wilson, Mark Hughes, Sean Rudder, Stacey Jones, Chris Beattie, Julien Rinaldi, Adel Fellous, Jérôme Guisset, Jamal Fakir, Ian Hindmarsh, Grégory Mounis, Renaud Guigue, Pascal Jampy and Alex Chan made their debut for the Dragons.
Round 1: Justin Murphy, Jamal Fakir, Laurent Frayssinous, Renaud Guigue, Ian Hindmarsh and Mark Hughes scored their 1st try for the Dragons.
Round 1: Laurent Frayssinous kicked his 1st goal for the Dragons.
Round 2: Bruno Verges and Julien Touxagas made their debut for the Dragons.
Round 3: Thomas Bosc made his debut for the Dragons.
Round 3: Chris Beattie, Thomas Bosc and John Wilson scored their 1st try for the Dragons.
Round 4: Grégory Mounis scored his 1st try for the Dragons.
Round 5: Michael Dobson and Lionel Teixido made their debut for the Dragons.
Round 5: Michael Dobson scored his 1st try for the Dragons.
Round 6: David Berthezène made his debut for the Dragons.
Round 6: Adel Fellous and Lionel Teixido scored their 1st try for the Dragons.
Round 6: Michael Dobson kicked his 1st goal for the Dragons.
Round 7: Alex Chan scored his 1st try for the Dragons.
CCR4: Frédéric Zitter and Rémi Casty made their debut for the Dragons.
CCR4: Rémi Casty, Frédéric Zitter, Sean Rudder and Bruno Verges scored their 1st try for the Dragons.
Round 8: Jérôme Guisset scored his 1st try for the Dragons.
Round 8: Bruno Verges scored his 1st hat-trick for the Dragons.
Round 8: Michael Dobson kicked his 1st drop goal for the Dragons.
Round 9: Julien Rinaldi kicked his 1st goal for the Dragons.
Round 10: Aurélien Cologni and Sébastien Martins made their debut for the Dragons.
Round 10: Aurélien Cologni scored his 1st try for the Dragons.
Round 14: John Wilson scored his 1st hat-trick for the Dragons.
CCR5: Michael Dobson reached 100 points for the Dragons.
Round 15: Stacey Jones scored his 1st try for the Dragons.
Round 16: Julien Rinaldi scored his 1st try for the Dragons.
Round 17: Younes Khattabi made his debut for the Dragons.
Round 17: Stacey Jones kicked his 1st goal for the Dragons.
Round 20: Justin Murphy scored his 1st hat-trick for the Dragons.
Round 22: Mathieu Griffi made his debut for the Dragons.
Round 25: Cyrille Gossard made his debut for the Dragons.
Round 25: Justin Murphy scored his 25th try and reached 100 points for the Dragons.
Round 25: Thomas Bosc kicked his 1st goal for the Dragons.

Fixtures and results

2006 Super League

Player appearances
Super League only

 = Injured

 = Suspended

Challenge Cup

Player appearances
Challenge Cup games only

Squad statistics

 Appearances and Points include (Super League, Challenge Cup and Play-offs) as of 15 September 2006.

Transfers

In

Out

References

2006 in rugby league by club
2006 in English rugby league
Catalans Dragons seasons